Arazaire and Arasa are a pair of closely related languages of uncertain affiliation.

These have been claimed to be either Panoan or Takanan, or Takanan with Panoan words. Campbell (2012) says they are too poorly attested to classify. However, Fleck (2013) classifies them definitely in the Madre de Dios branch of Panoan, and says that the confusion is due to a second, Takanan language that also went by the names Arazaire and Arasa; a similar naming problem has caused confusion with its close relative Yamiaka.

The name Arasairi has been used for  yet another language, a dialect of the language isolate Harakmbut.

References

Languages of Peru
Panoan languages
Tacanan languages